Juan Rodríguez may refer to:

Arts and entertainment
 Juan Rodríguez de la Cámara del Padrón (1390–1450), Spanish poet
 Juan Rodríguez Freyle (1566-1642), early Colombian writer of El Carnero
 Juan Rodríguez Botas (1880–1917), Canarian impressionist

Politics and law
 Juan Manuel Rodríguez (1771–1847), Salvadoran revolutionary against Spain and later president of the State of El Salvador (briefly in 1824)
 Juan Rodríguez Ballesteros ( fl. 1808), Spanish colonial administrator as regency Governor of Chile and Panama
 Juan Carlos Rodríguez Ibarra (born 1948), Spanish politician

Sports

Association football (soccer)
 Juan Manuel Rodríguez Vega (born 1944), Chilean footballer
 Juan Carlos Rodríguez Moreno (born 1965), Spanish footballer
 Juan José Rodríguez (born 1967), Costa Rican footballer
 Juan Pablo Rodríguez (born 1979), Mexican footballer
 Juan Rodríguez (footballer, born 1982), Spanish footballer
 Juan Josué Rodríguez (born 1988), Honduran footballer
 Juan Gabriel Rodríguez (born 1994), Argentine footballer
 Juan Rodríguez (footballer, born 1995), Spanish footballer

Combat sports
 Juan Francisco Rodríguez (born 1950), Spanish boxer
 Juan Rodríguez (wrestler) (born 1958), Cuban Olympic wrestler
 Juan Rodriguez (boxer) (born 1990), Venezuelan boxer

Other sports
 Juan Rodríguez (rower) (born 1928), Uruguayan rower 
 Chi-Chi Rodríguez (Juan Antonio Rodríguez, born 1935), American Puerto Rican golfer
 Juan Miguel Rodríguez (born 1967), Cuban sports shooter
 Juan Rodríguez (beach volleyball) (born 1979), Mexican beach volleyball player & medalist in 2002 Central American and Caribbean Games
 Juan Ignacio Rodríguez, (born 1992), Spanish archer

Others  
 Juan Rodríguez de Fonseca (1451–1524), Spanish religious leader and government administrator
 Juan Rodríguez the Deaf (fl. c. 1520), Spanish sailor and survivor of Magellan expedition
 Juan Rodríguez Cabrillo (died 1543), Portuguese sailor and soldier
 Juan (Jan) Rodriguez, first non-native resident of Manhattan Island
 Juan Manuel Rodriguez (writer) (born 1945), Ecuadorian professor and author